Bárbara Briceño Rabanal (born ) is a Peruvian female volleyball player. She is part of the Peru women's national volleyball team.

She participated in the 2014 FIVB Volleyball World Grand Prix.
On club level she played for Club Cesar Vallejo in 2014.

References

External links
 Profile at FIVB.org

1996 births
Living people
Peruvian women's volleyball players
Place of birth missing (living people)
20th-century Peruvian women
21st-century Peruvian women